Bartrop is an English surname. Notable people with the surname include:

 Paul R. Bartrop (born 1955), Australian historian
 Wilfred Bartrop (1887–1918), English footballer

English-language surnames